Keith Joseph Millard (born March 18, 1962) is an American former professional football player who played as a defensive tackle for nine seasons for the Minnesota Vikings, the Green Bay Packers, the Seattle Seahawks and the Philadelphia Eagles from 1985 to 1993 in the National Football League (NFL).

Early and college career 

Keith Millard was born in Pleasanton, California. He was a tight end and linebacker at Foothill High School in Pleasanton. Keith played college football at Washington State University.
As a freshman Millard played tight end but was moved to defensive tackle as a sophomore, where he started first time as a junior. Millard was voted first-team All-Pac-10 as a senior and won the Morris Trophy as the Pac-10's top defensive lineman.

Professional career 
Keith Millard was drafted by the Vikings based on a recommendation from their scout Don Deisch in the first round of the 1984 NFL Draft and played one season in the USFL. He was selected to the Pro Bowl in 1988 and 1989.  He held the NFL record for most sacks in a single season by a defensive tackle with 18 in 1989, and was named NFL Defensive Player of the Year that season. His record was broken by Aaron Donald in 2018. The following season he suffered a major knee injury in a week 4 contest versus Tampa Bay.  The injury effectively ended his time in Minnesota, and although he continued to play for a handful of seasons with various teams, he was never again as dominant of a force.

Keith's large stature was a huge asset in bulking up the Minnesota Vikings defensive line. His All-Pro honors and record-setting sacks make him a Minnesota Vikings great.  Millard played in 93 games during his career, making 58 sacks, and two interceptions.

Millard was voted among the top 50 players to ever play for the Minnesota Vikings In 2010.

NFL career statistics

Coaching career 

After retirement as a player, Keith Millard went on to coaching. He coached at the college level, in the Spring Football League with the Los Angeles Dragons, and the XFL, San Francisco Demons, before getting a job with the Denver Broncos' coaching staff as the club's defensive line coach/pass rush specialist. He was in charge of creating and implementing all pass rush techniques used in the Broncos' defensive scheme. Under Millard, the Broncos had one of the toughest defenses in the league. Millard coached the Oakland Raiders defensive line from 2005 to 2007. In 2009, Millard was hired as the defensive coordinator for the Merced College Blue Devils. On February 8, 2011, it was announced that Millard, along with Grady Stretz, will be a defensive line coach for the Tampa Bay Buccaneers, specializing in pass rush. In 2012, Millard was hired by the Titans as an assistant coach.

Notes and references 
He coached at Merced College in 2009

External links

1962 births
Living people
American football defensive tackles
Washington State Cougars football players
Jacksonville Bulls players
Minnesota Vikings players
Green Bay Packers players
Seattle Seahawks players
Philadelphia Eagles players
National Conference Pro Bowl players
San Francisco Demons coaches
Denver Broncos coaches
Oakland Raiders coaches
National Football League Defensive Player of the Year Award winners